The 2021 Westmeath Senior Hurling Championship was the 117th staging of the Westmeath Senior Hurling Championship since its establishment by the Westmeath County Board in 1903. The championship began on 14 August 2021 and ended on 7 November 2021.

Clonkill entered the championship as the defending champions, however, they were beaten by Castletown Geoghegan at the semi-final stage.

The final was played on 7 November 2021 at TEG Cusack Park in Mullingar, between Raharney and Castletown Geoghegan, in what was their first meeting in a final in four years. Raharney won the match by 0-21 to 0-18 to claim their 14th championship title overall and a first title in five years.

Results

Group stage

Group stage table

Knockout stage

Semi-final

Final

References

External links
 Fixtures and results at the Westmeath GAA website

Westmeath Senior Hurling Championship
Westmeath Senior Hurling Championship
Westmeath Senior Hurling Championship